Reriutaba is a municipality in the state of Ceará in the Northeast region of Brazil.

Reriutaba is the hometown of the television presenter João Carrasco, better known as Joãozinho Carrasco.

See also
List of municipalities in Ceará

References

Municipalities in Ceará